The United States Committee on the Marine Transportation System (CMTS) is an inter-agency committee authorized by the United States Coast Guard and the Maritime Transportation Act of 2012 (Pub.L. 112-213, Sec. 310, § 55502)  to coordinate policies affecting the U.S. Marine Transportation System (MTS).  

The CMTS is a Federal Cabinet-level, inter-departmental committee chaired by the United States Secretary of Transportation, with members including Secretaries and Administrators of 14 Departments and Independent Government Agencies, along with representatives from the Executive Office of the President. The CMTS is authorized to assess the adequacy of the MTS, promote the integration of the MTS with other modes of transportation and the marine environment, and coordinate, improve the coordination of, and make recommendations regarding federal policies that impact the MTS.  

The MTS is a network of ports, waterways, navigable channels, marine terminals, inter-modal connections that allow for the transportation of people and goods to, from, and on the water. The MTS includes 25,000 miles of navigable channels, 361 commercial ports, 50,000 Federal ATONs, 20,000 bridges, the Great Lakes and St. Lawrence Seaway.

Organization

Cabinet-level Committee

Chair
 Secretary of Transportation

Members
 Administrator of the Environmental Protection Agency
 Advisor to the President on National Security
 Assistant to the President for Domestic Policy
 Assistant to the President for Economic Policy
 Assistant to the President for Homeland Security and Counterterrorism 
 Assistant to the President for Science and Technology Policy
 Attorney General
 Chairman of the Joint Chiefs of Staff
 Chairman of the Marine Mammal Commission
 Chairman of the National Transportation Safety Board
 Council on Environmental Quality Chair
 Director, National Maritime Intelligence-Integration Office
 Director of the Office of Management and Budget
 Secretary of Agriculture
 Secretary of Commerce
 Secretary of Defense
 Secretary of Energy
 Secretary of Homeland Security
 Secretary of (the) Interior
 Secretary of Labor
 Secretary of (the) Treasury

Coordinating Board
 Bureau of Safety and Environmental Enforcement
 Environmental Protection Agency
 Federal Maritime Commission
 International Trade Administration
 Marine Mammal Commission
 Maritime Administration
 National Maritime Intelligence-Integration Office
 National Oceanic and Atmospheric Administration
 National Security Council
 National Transportation Safety Board
 Oceanographer of the Navy
 Office of Management and Budget
 Office of Science and Technology Policy
 Office of Trade and Manufacturing Policy
 Saint Lawrence Seaway Development Corporation
 U.S. Army Corps of Engineers
 U.S. Coast Guard
 U.S. Department of Agriculture
 U.S. Department of Energy
 U.S. Department of Homeland Security
 U.S. Department of Justice
 U.S. Department of Labor
 U.S. Department of State
 U.S. Department of the Treasury
 U.S. Department of Transportation
 U.S. Merchant Marine Academy

CMTS Integrated Action Teams and Task Teams
 U.S. Arctic Marine Shipping Integrated Action Team 
 Maritime Data Integrated Action Team
 Infrastructure and Supply Chain Integrated Action Team
 MTS Resilience Integrated Action Team
 MTS Innovative Science and Technology Integrated Action Team
 Future of Navigation Integrated Action Team
 Military to Mariner Task Team
 COVID-19 Working Group

References

External links
CMTS website

United States Department of Transportation
Executive Office of the President of the United States
United States federal boards, commissions, and committees
U.S. maritime transport authorities